Michèle Bernier (born 2 August 1956) is a French actress, writer and director.

Personal life
She is the daughter of Georges Bernier (1929-2005), better known by the name of Professeur Choron and Odile Vaudelle (1934-1985).

From 1982 to 1997, she was in a relationship with the author Bruno Gaccio. They had two children, Charlotte (born in 1987) and Enzo (born in 1997).

Career
After a theatrical training, she joined Le Petit Théâtre de Bouvard with many other comedians. There, she created a female comedy trio, "The Girls", together with Mimie Mathy and Isabelle de Botton.

Theatre

Filmography

References

External links

 

1956 births
Living people
French television actresses
French film actresses
20th-century French actresses
21st-century French actresses
Mass media people from Paris
Women television directors
French television directors
French women screenwriters
French screenwriters